Aleksi Mikael Varttinen (born 26 June 1997) is a Finnish professional ice hockey defenceman. He is currently a free agent.

Career
Varttinen began his career with Ässät, playing in their various Jr. teams between 2015 and 2019. After that he played for their senior team.

On August 25, 2021, Varttinen signed for MHk 32 Liptovský Mikuláš of Slovakia's Tipos extraliga.

Career statistics

Regular season and playoffs

References

External links

 

1997 births
Living people
Finnish ice hockey defencemen
Ässät players
Hokki players
People from Eura
MHk 32 Liptovský Mikuláš players
SaPKo players
Finnish expatriate ice hockey players in Slovakia
Finnish expatriate ice hockey players in Poland
Sportspeople from Satakunta